John Scarburgh (fl. 1406), was an English Member of Parliament.

He was a Member (MP) of the Parliament of England for Shaftesbury in 1406.

References

14th-century births
15th-century deaths
English MPs 1406